Thompson Christian School is a private school in Davao City, Philippines, founded by the International Church of the Foursquare Gospel. It provides a non-sectarian, non-stock, non-profit and non-political education.

References

External links

Private schools in the Philippines
Schools in Davao City
Educational institutions established in 1959
1959 establishments in the Philippines